Miloš Zukanović (born 8 February 1996) is a Serbian professional footballer who plays as a forward for Metaloglobus București.

Career
Zukanović passed the youth categories of Red Star Belgrade. After he terminated the contract with club, he joined the NAC Breda, and made his professional debut in the 19th round of the 2014–15 Eredivisie, against Willem II on 25 January 2015.

In August 2015, he signed with French side Lens to play with the club's reserves.

After one year with Red Star, another French club, he returned to Serbia and signed a two-year contract with Napredak Kruševac in January 2019.

Personal life
Zukanović holds Serbian and Croatian passports.

References

External links
 
 

1996 births
Living people
Footballers from Split, Croatia
Serbs of Croatia
Association football forwards
Serbian footballers
Serbia youth international footballers
NAC Breda players
Red Star F.C. players
FK Napredak Kruševac players
FK Mačva Šabac players
FK Radnički 1923 players
ND Gorica players
FC Metaloglobus București players
Eredivisie players
Championnat National 2 players
Championnat National players
Serbian SuperLiga players
Serbian First League players
Slovenian Second League players
Liga II players
Serbian expatriate footballers
Serbian expatriate sportspeople in the Netherlands
Serbian expatriate sportspeople in France
Serbian expatriate sportspeople in Slovenia
Serbian expatriate sportspeople in Romania
Expatriate footballers in the Netherlands
Expatriate footballers in France
Expatriate footballers in Slovenia
Expatriate footballers in Romania